PPSh may refer to:

 PPSh-41, a Soviet World War II-era submachine gun with a drum or normal magazine
 PPS-43, a.k.a. PPS, a different Soviet World War II-era submachine gun
 Party of Labour of Albania, Partia e Punës e Shqipërisë, PPSh in Albanian
 Pseudovaginal perineoscrotal hypospadias